Promises and Lies is the tenth album by the British reggae band UB40, released in 1993. It includes the hit from the soundtrack of the 1993 movie Sliver, "Can't Help Falling in Love", originally sung by Elvis Presley. The album reached No. 1 in the UK and No. 6 in the United States. It is the band's best-selling album, having sold over 9 million copies.

Track listing

Charts

Weekly charts

Year-end charts

Certifications and sales

See also
List of best-selling albums in Indonesia

References

1993 albums
UB40 albums